Maria Curatolo (born 12 October 1963) is a former Italian long-distance runner who specialized in the marathon race.

Biography
She finished eighth at the 1988 Summer Olympics, tenth at the 1988 IAAF World Cross Country Championships and won the silver medal at the 1994 European Championships.

Achievements

National titles
Curatolo won nine national championships at individual senior level.
Italian Athletics Championships
10,000 m: 1985, 1987, 1988, 1989 (4)
Half marathon: 1986, 1988, 1995 (3)
Italian Cross Country Championships
Long race: 1987, 1988 (2)

See also
 Italian team at the running events
 Italian all-time top lists – 10000 metres

References

External links
 
 Maria Curatolo at All-athletics.com

1963 births
Living people
Italian female long-distance runners
Italian female cross country runners
Italian female marathon runners
Athletes (track and field) at the 1988 Summer Olympics
Athletes (track and field) at the 1996 Summer Olympics
Olympic athletes of Italy
Sportspeople from Turin
European Athletics Championships medalists
World Athletics Championships athletes for Italy
20th-century Italian women
21st-century Italian women